Rosenbergia xenium is a species of beetle in the family Cerambycidae. It was described by Rigout in 1992. It is known from Papua New Guinea.

References

Batocerini
Beetles described in 1992
Beetles of Oceania